

Johann Condné (9 January 1919 – 26 October 2001) was a German general in the Bundeswehr. During World War II, he served as an officer in the Wehrmacht and was a recipient of the Knight's Cross of the Iron Cross of Nazi Germany. Condné joined the Bundeswehr in 1955 and retired in 1979 as a Brigadegeneral.

Awards and decorations

 Knight's Cross of the Iron Cross on 5 April 1945 as Hauptmann and commander of II./Panzergrenadier-Regiment 6

References

 

1919 births
2001 deaths
Bundeswehr generals
Recipients of the Knight's Cross of the Iron Cross
People from Sankt Wendel (district)
People from the Rhine Province
Brigadier generals of the German Army
German prisoners of war in World War II held by the United Kingdom
Military personnel from Saarland